Michael W. Deem is an American engineer, scientist, inventor, and entrepreneur.  Deem received his B.S. in Chemical Engineering from the California Institute of Technology in 1991 and his Ph.D. in Chemical Engineering from the University of California at Berkeley in 1994.  His thesis research was in statistical mechanics and disordered materials with David Chandler.  He did postdoctoral research at Harvard University in Physics with David R. Nelson.  Deem joined the faculty at University of California, Los Angeles, in 1996 and rose to the rank of Associate Professor of Chemical Engineering.  From 2002 to 2020 Deem was the John W. Cox Professor of Biochemical and Genetic Engineering and Professor of Physics & Astronomy at Rice University in Houston, Texas.  Deem was the founding director of the Graduate Program in Systems, Synthetic, and Physical Biology at Rice University, 2012-2014.  From 2014 to 2017, Deem served as the Chair of the Bioengineering Department at Rice University.

Deem has been elected Fellow to the American Physical Society, the American Institute for Medical and Biological Engineering, the American Academy of Arts and Sciences, and the Biomedical Engineering Society.  He is a recipient of numerous awards, including a National Science Foundation CAREER Award (1997), Top 100 Young Innovator by the MIT Technology Review (1999), Alfred P. Sloan Fellow (2000) (2000), Camille Dreyfus Teacher-Scholar Award (2002), Allan P. Colburn Award of the AIChE (2004), Professional Progress Award of the AIChE (2010), Edith and Peter O'Donnell Award of TAMEST, visiting scholar of Phi Beta Kappa (2012-2013), and Donald W. Breck Award in Molecular Sieve Science from the International Zeolite Association (2019).

Deem is known for work in evolution, vaccines and immunology, parallel tempering and statistical mechanics, and materials.  He has developed methods to quantify vaccine effectiveness and antigenic distance for influenza, methods to sculpt the immune system to mitigate immunodominance in dengue fever, a physical theory of the competition that allows HIV to escape from the immune system, an exact solution of a quasispecies theory of evolution that accounts for cross-species genetic exchange, a hierarchical approach to protein molecular evolution, a `thermodynamic' formulation of evolution, a theory for how biological modularity spontaneously arises in an evolving system, and elucidated how static and dynamic measures of human brain connectivity predict complementary aspects of human cognitive performance. In the materials field, he developed the widely-used DIFFAX and ZEFSA methods for zeolites.  He developed a database of hypothetical zeolite frameworks that contains greater than 4 million structures. He developed methods to design structure directing agents for zeolites, leading to among other results the first synthesis of a pure chiral zeolite enantiomorph.

From 2008 to 2010, Deem was an academic adviser to He Jiankui, the controversial scientist who was involved with the He Jiankui affair related to gene-edited babies.

From 2021 to 2022, Deem was an Entrepreneur in Residence at Khosla Ventures, where he worked to select, mentor, and incubate portfolio companies.

See also
Evidence of common descent

References

External links
Michael Deem's LinkedIn Page
Michael Deem's Research Page

American biochemists
Living people
California Institute of Technology alumni
UC Berkeley College of Chemistry alumni
Year of birth missing (living people)
Fellows of the American Physical Society